Defia Rosmaniar (born 25 May 1995) is an Indonesian taekwondo practitioner. She won medals at several multi-sport events, including Asian Games, Asian Indoor and Martial Arts Games, Southeast Asian Games and Islamic Solidarity Games. She won Indonesia's first gold medal at the 2018 Asian Games, held in Indonesia.

Career 
Defia Rosmaniar took up taekwondo in 2007 following her brother. She entered into the 2013 Southeast Asian Games, her first international multi-sport event at the age of 18 and went onto secure bronze medals in women's team and mixed pair events. She represented Indonesia at the 2017 Asian Indoor and Martial Arts Games claiming a bronze medal in the women's individual event and was part of the Indonesian women's squad which secured silver in the team event.

Rosmaniar won a gold medal in the women's poomsae individual event, which became the first medal to be earned by the host nation, Indonesia, at the 2018 Asian Games.

Awards and nominations

References 

1995 births
Living people
Indonesian female taekwondo practitioners
Taekwondo practitioners at the 2018 Asian Games
Asian Games gold medalists for Indonesia
Asian Games medalists in taekwondo
Medalists at the 2018 Asian Games
Competitors at the 2013 Southeast Asian Games
Competitors at the 2017 Southeast Asian Games
Southeast Asian Games bronze medalists for Indonesia
Southeast Asian Games medalists in taekwondo
Islamic Solidarity Games medalists in taekwondo
Islamic Solidarity Games competitors for Indonesia
Competitors at the 2021 Southeast Asian Games
21st-century Indonesian women
20th-century Indonesian women